Psidium myrtoides or araçá-una is a species of plant in the family Myrtaceae. It is found in Atlantic Forest in São Paulo and northern Paraná, Brazil. The plant grows up to 4-6 meter and sometimes 8 meters tall. It blooms from October to December with solitary white flowers. Fruits are round 2.5-4.2 cm wide with a reddish pulp that is somewhat bitter and around ten white seeds.

The plant is tolerant of different types of soil with pH ranging from 5.5 - 6.2. It can take temperatures up to -4 degrees Celsius.

Gallery

References

External links
 
 

Flora of Brazil
myrtoides